Elkwood is an unincorporated community in Culpeper County, Virginia, United States. Elkwood has a post office with ZIP code 22718.

Climate
The climate in this area is characterized by hot, humid summers and generally mild to cool winters.  According to the Köppen Climate Classification system, Elkwood has a humid subtropical climate, abbreviated "Cfa" on climate maps.

References

Unincorporated communities in Culpeper County, Virginia
Unincorporated communities in Virginia